Francis William Maher  (22 September 1895 – 7 November 1976) was a decorated Australian soldier who served in the First AIF, and was an Australian footballer and coach in the Victorian Football League (VFL) and the Victorian Football Association (VFA).

Family
The son of Cornelius Maher (1865–1934), and Mary Jane Maher (1869–1943), née Walmsley, Francis William Maher was born in Camberwell, Victoria, on 22 September 1895.

He married Harriet Louise "Ettie" Benyan (1899–1979) in 1920.

Military service
Maher served in the First AIF as a machine gunner from 1916 to 1919. Enlisted as a private, and holding the rank of Lieutenant at his discharge from service, he was awarded the Military Medal for gallantry in May 1918 for his actions in France during the Battle of Broodseinde in October 1917.

Football
He only began playing football when serving overseas with the AIF; and, on his return to Australia, he started playing football with two clubs, Shepparton and Lilydale.

"Horrie Gorringe, the solid little Tasmanian, is the finest rover I have ever seen. I could describe him in three words — the perfect footballer …Second to Gorringe I would place Frank Maher, former Essendon rover and brainy little tactician.Maher made a study of football, and his brilliance, pace, tricks and anticipation were all backed glorious passes which, literally speaking, went down a comrade's throat.Maher came out of a crush and instinctively put the ball in the right direction — always to the best advantage of his side.He had a swerve that invariably got him out of trouble.Never at any time did he play the man, and he hated to give away a free kick.His play left nothing to be desired.In my opinion Maher was second to Gorringe only because he did not have the strength and physique of the Tasmanian."               306-game Collingwood champion Gordon Coventry, 1938.

Essendon (VFL)
In the 1921 pre-season, he trained impressively with Carlton; however, once it was established that he resided in Essendon's territory, he signed with Essendon. Recruited from Lilydale Football Club, he played his first game for Essendon in 1921, at the advanced age of 25, against Carlton at the East Melbourne Cricket Ground on 11 June 1921.

"Mosquito Fleet"
Maher was only 5'6" tall; and, along with six others — Jack Garden (5'5"), Charlie Hardy (5'3"), Vince Irwin (5'6"), George "Tich" Shorten (5'5"),  Jimmy Sullivan (5'6"), and Rowley Watt (5'4") — Maher was one of Essendon's legendary "mosquito fleet". According to some, (for example, Essendon's Famous "Mosquito Fleet" is a Worry to Opposing Sides, The Sporting Globe, (Saturday, 22 May 1926), p.6.) there were another two Essendon players that were diminutive enough to be considered to be "mosquitoes": Garnet Campbell (5'7½"), and Greg Stockdale (5'8").

The term "mosquito fleet" was drawn by analogy from a maritime expression relating to particular assemblies of small vessels (e.g., the South Australian "mosquito fleet", the Queensland "mosquito fleet", a number of different U.S. "mosquito fleets", etc.).

Career
He played 137 games with Essendon Football Club from 1921 to 1928. The last 118 of those games — from round 12 in 1922 to round 17 in 1928 inclusive (he did not play in the last match of the 1928 season, "[having] requested the selectors not to consider him for the match as he was not in form") — were played consecutively.

He was first rover (with 2 goals) in the 1923 premiership team, and played on the half-forward flank (with 4 goals in the three matches) in the team that won the 1924 (round-robin) premiership.

Maher was captain-coach of Essendon in 1927; and, although his application to coach Essendon in 1928 was rejected, he captained Essendon in that year.

Victorian representative player
He represented Victoria on nine occasions in 1921, 1922, 1923, 1925, 1926, 1927 (captain), and 1928 (captain).

Maher, was captain of the Victorian Football League representative team that played against the Ovens and Murray Football League in Wangaratta in June, 1928 and praised a 16 year old Haydn Bunton (O&MFL) after the games as a player "who could hold his own in any league team".

Brownlow medal (third place)
He polled strongly in the 1925 Brownlow Medal, coming in third place with four votes.

Oakleigh (VFA)
Late in 1928, the VFA decided to expand its number of teams from ten to twelve. Oakleigh and Sandringham were chosen to take part in the 1929 VFA competition.

In 1929 Maher was cleared from Essendon to serve as Oakleigh's captain-coach for its first season in the VFA. He was paid £9 per week; "a huge fee at this time" — "it was double the basic wage". Recruiting Maher also meant that Oakleigh — with Maher as its first rover, and ex-Richmond George Rudolph and ex-Geelong Eric Fleming as its followers — had a formidable first ruck combination.

Oakleigh won two VFA premiership with Maher as its captain-coach: the first in 1930, when it defeated Northcote in a fiery match, and in 1931, when it, again, defeated Northcote.

Fitzroy (VFL)
He left Oakleigh at the end of 1931, and having been selected ahead of fourteen other applicants, he was appointed the non-playing coach of Fitzroy in 1932, and served as coach for two seasons, 1932 and 1933. He was replaced as coach in 1933, by Jack Cashman, due to the club's decision to appoint a playing coach. Ironically, Cashman resigned after serving only two games as Fitzroy's captain-coach, citing difficulties with members and supporters of the club, and was immediately cleared to Carlton.

Oakleigh (VFA)
Once it was made known that Maher was not continuing as Fitzroy's coach, Oakleigh appointed him as its non-playing coach for the 1934 season.

Carlton (VFL)
Rejecting offers to return to coach Fitzroy, Maher coached the Carlton Football Club in 1935 and in 1936. He was unable to continue coaching in 1937 due to a move to Sydney in late 1936 to take up new position with his employer.

General Motors-Holden
Originally employed with the Commonwealth Statistician, Maher resigned from the public service in 1928 when the Statistician's Office was transferred from Melbourne to Canberra. He immediately transferred to General Motors; and, in late 1936, he was promoted to a position with General Motors in Sydney. In 1946, he was appointed Victorian sales manager of General Motors-Holden's Limited.

Essendon Past Players & Officials Association
He was president of Essendon's past players and officials association (1958–1968).

Death
He died on 7 November 1976.

See also
 1927 Melbourne Carnival
 Essendon Football Club's Team of the Century

Notes

References
 Fiddian, Marc: Devils at Play. A History of the Oakleigh Football Club, Pakenham Gazette, Pakenham 1982
 Maplestone, M., Flying Higher: History of the Essendon Football Club 1872–1996, Essendon Football Club, (Melbourne), 1996. 
 Ross, J. (ed), 100 Years of Australian Football 1897–1996: The Complete Story of the AFL, All the Big Stories, All the Great Pictures, All the Champions, Every AFL Season Reported, Viking, (Ringwood), 1996. 
 World War One Service Record: Lieutenant Francis William Maher (3845), National Archives of Australia.
 World War One Embarkation Roll: Private Francis William Maher (3845).
 War One Nominal Roll: Lieutenant Francis William Maher (3845), UNSW Canberra at the Australian Defence Force Academy.
 Victorian League Football, 1928 — Essendon Team, The Weekly Times, (Saturday, 25 August 1928), p.46.

External links 
 
 Frank Maher VFL coaching statistics from AFL Tables.
 
 Blueseum Biography: Frank Maher, coach and war hero
 Champions of Essendon Profile: Frank Maher
 Boyles Football Photos: Frank Maher.
 The VFA Project: Frank Maher

1895 births
1976 deaths
Essendon Football Club players
Essendon Football Club Premiership players
Essendon Football Club coaches
Fitzroy Football Club coaches
Carlton Football Club coaches
Crichton Medal winners
Oakleigh Football Club players
Oakleigh Football Club coaches
Shepparton Football Club players
Australian rules footballers from Melbourne
Australian military personnel of World War I
Two-time VFL/AFL Premiership players
People from Camberwell, Victoria
Military personnel from Melbourne